North Drumheller is a community within the Town of Drumheller, Alberta, Canada. It was previously a hamlet within the former Municipal District of Badlands No. 7 (then Improvement District No. 7) prior to being annexed by Drumheller in 1967. The community is located within the Red Deer River valley at the intersection of Highway 9 and North Dinosaur Trail (Highway 838) on the north side of the river across from Drumheller's main townsite.

See also 
List of communities in Alberta

References 

Drumheller
Former hamlets in Alberta